Panfilovo is a rural locality (a village) in Golovinskoye Rural Settlement, Sudogodsky District, Vladimir Oblast, Russia. The population was 9 as of 2010.

Geography 
Panfilovo is located on the Vanchuga River, 26 km southwest of Sudogda (the district's administrative centre) by road. Buchkovo is the nearest rural locality.

References 

Rural localities in Sudogodsky District